RGK Mobile is a global m-commerce service provider.

Company 
RGK Mobile is a global provider of mobile carrier payment solutions, specializing in payment aggregation.

Services 
 Mobile Operator Solutions 
 Payment Aggregation 
 Virtual Mobile Content Provider 
 Pre-approved Offers 
 RGK Engine

Key people 
 Roman Taranov- Co-founder and CEO 
 Evgeny Kayumov- Co-founder and Chief Marketing Officer

References 

Information technology companies of Spain
Mobile payments
Payment systems
Mobile marketing